Albertdina is a smock mill in Noord-Sleen, Netherlands. It was built in 1906 and is listed as a Rijksmonument, number 33783.

History
The windmill Concordia stood on this site from 1904 until it was burnt down in 1906. It had originally been built in Damsterdiep, Groningen in 1771 and moved to Noord-Sleen in 1904 To replace it, the 1851-built corn mill Molen van Grashuis was moved from Usquert, Groningen, to Noord-Sleen by millwright H Wiertsma of Scheemda, Groningen. The first miller was Mr Westerling. Nine windmills that he worked burnt down. Westerling took a mill at 't Haantje in 1909 and Albertdina was bought by J Ziengs. The mill was restored in 1953 by millwright Christiaan Bremer of Adorp, Groningen. Since 1976 the mill has been owned by the local council. During the 1970s, the mill had a pair of Patent sails and a pair of Common sails, but it now has four Common sails. The sails have been shortened due to a nearby building.

Description

Albertdina is what the Dutch describe as an "achtkante grondzeiler". It is a three-storey smock mill on a single-storey brick base. There is no stage, the sails reaching almost to the ground. The smock and cap are thatched. The mill is winded by a tailpole and winch. The windshaft also carries the brake wheel, which has 65 cogs. The brake wheel drives the wallower (35 cogs) at the top of the upright shaft. At the bottom of the upright shaft the great spur wheel, which has 102 cogs, drives the  diameter French Burr millstones via lantern pinion stone nut which has 27 staves.

Millers
 Westerling 1906–09
J Ziengs 1909–

Reference for above:-

Public access

Albertdina is open by appointment, or when a blue flag is flying. It is open on the Dutch National Mills Day and Open Monument Day.

References

Windmills in Drenthe
Smock mills in the Netherlands
Windmills completed in 1906
Grinding mills in the Netherlands
Rijksmonuments in Drenthe
Octagonal buildings in the Netherlands
Coevorden
1906 establishments in the Netherlands
20th-century architecture in the Netherlands